Paradesi Jews immigrated to the Indian subcontinent during the 15th and 16th centuries following the expulsion of Jews from Spain. Paradesi refers to the Malayalam word that means foreign as they were newcomers. These Sephardic (from Spain and Portugal) immigrants fled persecution and death by burning in the wake of the 1492 Alhambra decree expelling all Jews who did not convert to Christianity from Spain, and King Manuel's 1496 decree expelling Jews from Portugal. They are sometimes referred to as "White Jews", although that usage is generally considered pejorative or discriminatory and refers to relatively recent Jewish immigrants (end of the 15th century onward), predominantly Sephardim.

During the 18th and 19th centuries, Paradesi Jews were Sephardi immigrants to the Indian subcontinent from Jewish exodus from Arab and Muslim countries fleeing forcible conversion, persecution and antisemitism. The Paradesi Jews of Cochin traded in spices. They are a community of Sephardic Jews settled among the larger Cochin Jewish community located in Kerala, a coastal southern state of India.

Paradesi Jews of Madras (now Chennai) traded in Golconda diamonds, precious stones and corals. They had very good relations with the rulers of Golkonda, because they maintained trade connections to some foreign countries (e.g. Ottoman empire, Europe), and their language skills were useful. Although the Sephardim spoke Ladino (i.e. Judeo-Spanish), in India they learned Tamil and Konkani as well as Judeo-Malayalam from the Cochin Jews, also known as Malabar Jews.

After India gained its independence in 1947 and Israel was established as a nation, most of the Malabar Jews made Aliyah and emigrated from Kerala to Israel in the mid-1950s. In contrast, most of the Paradesi Jews preferred to migrate to Australia and other Commonwealth countries, similar to the choices made by Anglo-Indians.

History of Madras (Chennai) Jews

The East India Company (EIC) wanted to break the monopoly of Portugal in trading with Golconda diamonds and precious stones from the mines of Golkonda. The EIC entered India around 1600 and had built the Fort St. George (White Town) fortress by 1644 at the coastal city of Madras, now known as Chennai.

EIC policy permitted only its shareholders to trade in Golconda diamonds and precious stones from the mines. The Company considered the Madras Jews to be interlopers because they traded separately through their Jewish community connections.

Madras Jews specialised in Golconda diamonds, precious stones and corals. They had very good relations with the rulers of Golkonda and this was seen as beneficial to Fort St. George, so Madras Jews were gradually accepted as honourable citizens of Fort St. George/Madras.

Jacques de Paiva (Jaime Paiva), originally from Amsterdam and belonging to Amsterdam Sephardic community, was an early Jewish arrival and the leader of Madras Jewish community. He built the Second Madras Synagogue and Jewish Cemetery Chennai in Peddanaickenpet, which later became the South end of Mint Street,

Jacques (Jaime) de Paiva (Pavia) established good relations with those in power and bought several Golconda diamond mines to source Golconda diamonds. Through his efforts, Jews were permitted to live within Fort St. George.

Jacques (Jaime) de Paiva (Pavia)  died in 1687 after a visit to his Golconda diamond mines and was buried in the Jewish cemetery which he had established in Peddanaickenpet, which later became the north Mint Street, alongside the synagogue which also existed at Mint Street.

After Jacques (Jaime) de Paiva (Pavia)'s death in 1687, his wife Hieronima de Paiva fell in love with Elihu Yale, Governor of Madras and went to live with him, causing quite a scandal within Madras’ colonial society. Governor Elihu Yale later achieved fame when he gave a large donation to the University of New Haven in Connecticut, which was then named after him — the Yale University. Elihu Yale and Hieromima de Paiva had a son, who died in South Africa.

In 1670, the Portuguese population in Madras numbered around 3000. Before his death he established ‘The Colony of Jewish Traders of Madraspatam’ with Antonio do Porto, Pedro Pereira and Fernando Mendes Henriques. This enabled more Portuguese Jews, from Leghorn, the Caribbean, London and Amsterdam to settle in Madras. Coral Merchant Street was named after the Jews' business.

Three Portuguese Jews were nominated to be aldermen of Madras Corporation. Three - Bartolomeo Rodrigues, Domingo do Porto and Alvaro da Fonseca - also founded the largest trading house in Madras. The large tomb of Rodrigues, who died in Madras in 1692, became a landmark in Peddanaickenpet but was later destroyed.

Samuel de Castro came to Madras from Curaçao in 1766 and Salomon Franco came from Leghorn.

Isaac Sardo Abendana (1662–1709), who came from Holland, died in Madras. He was a close friend of Thomas Pitt and may have been responsible for the fortune that Pitt amassed.

Portuguese Jews were used as diplomats by the East India Company to expand English trading. Avraham Navarro was the most prominent of these.

In 1688, the famous Sephardi poet Daniel Levy de Barrios wrote a poem in Amsterdam, with historical and geographical meaning. His information was usually most precise and drawing upon him we may receive a panorama of Sephardi life in the seventeenth century. There were six Jewish communities — Nieves, London, Jamaica, fourth and fifth in two parts of Barbados, and the sixth in Madras-Patan.

During the 18th and 19th centuries Yemenite Jews started coming to Madras via Cochin. They were very religious. Some came from Najran. They were Rabbis and jewelry-makers.

From the 19th centuries Yemenite Jews and Portuguese Jews started intermarrying.

Paradesi synagogues and cemeteries 
The Paradesi Jews had built three Paradesi synagogues and cemeteries.

In 1500 the first Madras Synagogue and cemeteries was built by the Amsterdam Sephardic community in Coral Merchant Street, George Town, Madras, which had a large presence of Portuguese Jews in the seventeenth and eighteenth centuries. Neither the synagogue nor the Jewish population remains today.

In 1568 the first Cochin Paradesi Synagogue and cemetery was built in Cochin-Jew Street, adjacent to Mattancherry Palace, Cochin, now part of the Indian city of Ernakulam, on land given to them by the Raja of Kochi.

In 1644 the second Madras Synagogue and Jewish Cemetery Chennai was built by Jacques (Jaime) de Paiva (Pavia) also from Amsterdam Sephardic community in Madras, Peddanaickenpet, which later became the south end of Mint Street, It was demolished by local government in 1934 and the tombstones were moved to the Central Park of Madras along with the gate of the cemetery on which Beit ha-Haim (the usual designation for a Jewish cemetery, literally "House of Life") were written in Hebrew. The tombstones were moved again  to Kasimedu, when a government school was approved to be built. In 1983, they were moved to Lloyds Road, when the Chennai Harbour expansion project was approved. In this whole process seventeen tombstones went missing, including that of de Paiva.

Last Jewish Business House and Trust of Chennai, Owned by Henriques De Castro Family 
 HDC Transports, Henriques De Castro family.
 HDC Industrial and management consultants, Henriques De Castro family.
 Isaac and Rosa Charitable Trust, Henriques De Castro family.

Places named after Madras (Chennai) Jews 

 Isaac Street was named after Isaac Henriques De Castro, who was killed in the Holocaust.
 Pereira Street was named after Pedro Pereira, a member the colony of Jewish traders of Madraspatam.
 Coral Merchant Street was named after Jewish settlement.
 De Caster Main Road was named after De Castro family (Portuguese Jew).

Notable Madras (Chennai) Jews
 Jacques de Paiva – The first Madras Jewish community leader, he built the Second Madras Synagogue and Jewish Cemetery Chennai in Madras, Peddanaickenpet.
 Bartolomeo Rodrigues – Among 12 aldermen who founded Madras Corporation
 Domingo do Porto – Among 12 aldermen who founded Madras Corporation
 Alvaro da Fonseca – Among 12 aldermen who founded Madras Corporation
 Above Four were called four brothers, they had their own garden in which Bartolomeo Rodrigues Tomb was built
 Plan of Fort St George and the city of Madras in 1726, shows Four Brothers Garden and Bartolomeo Rodrigues Tomb
 Antonio do Porto – The Colony of Jewish Traders of Madraspatam
 Pedro Pereira – The Colony of Jewish Traders of Madraspatam
 Fernando Mendes Henriques – The Colony of Jewish Traders of Madraspatam
 Avraham Navarro – Prominent Jewish diplomat of East India Company
 Samuel de Castro – Founder of De Castro Trading house.
 Salomon Franco – Founder of De Castro Trading house.
 Isaac Sardo Abendana – Best Diamond Appraiser
 Isaac Henriques De Castro - Close friend of C. N. Annadurai Former Chief Minister of Tamil Nadu 
 Rabbi Salomon Halevi - Last Rabbi of Madras Synagogue

Madras (Chennai) Jewish surnames (partial list)

ABENDANA SARDO
 Cohen
 De Castro
 DE PAIVA
 Franco
 Halevi
 Helen Herzberg
 Henriques De Castro
 Henriques
 HEYNEMANN
 JOSHUA
 Levi
 Meyer
 NAVARRO
 Pereira
 RODRIGUES
 do Porto
 da Fonseca
 Mendes
 Salomón 
 SALOMONS
 SOFAER
 Toback
 WECHSLER
 Weichmann
 Wolf
 Moonien

Image gallery

See also
 Gathering of Israel
 History of the Jews in India
 Jewish Cemetery Chennai
 Madras Synagogue
 Meshuchrarim Jews of Cochin
 Synagogues in India

References

Further reading
 Diamonds and Coral: Anglo-Dutch Jews and Eighteenth-Century Trade New edition by Gedalia Yogev  (Author)
 Renascent Empire?: The House of Braganza and the Quest for Stability in Portuguese Monsoon Asia C.1640-1683 by Glenn Joseph Ames
 Global Trade and Commercial Networks: Eighteenth-Century Diamond Merchants By Tijl Vanneste
 Goods from the East, 1600-1800: Trading Eurasia By Felicia Gottmann, Hanna Hodacs, Chris Nierstrasz
 The Jewish Merchant-Colony in Madras (Fort St. George) during the 17th and 18th Centuries: A Contribution to the Economic and Social History of the Jews in India (Concluded) Walter J. Fischel
 The Palgrave Dictionary of Anglo-Jewish History edited by W. Rubinstein, Michael A. Jolles

External links 

 Jews of Kerala
 The Jews of Chennai

 
Ethnic groups in Kerala
 
Jewish ethnic groups
Judaism in Kerala
Sephardi Jewish culture in India